Caflisch is a Germanic surname. Notable people with the surname include:

Jakob Friedrich Caflisch (1817–1882), German botanist
Lucius Caflisch (born 1936), Swiss international law specialist
Russel E. Caflisch (born 1954), American mathematician

Germanic-language surnames